Francoeur is a surname. Notable people with the surname include:

 François Francoeur (1698–1787), French violinist and composer
 Jacques Francoeur (1925–2005), businessman and journalist of Quebec
 Jeff Francoeur (born 1984), Major League Baseball player
 Joseph-Napoléon Francoeur (1880–1965), politician and lawyer of Quebec
 Louis-Benjamin Francoeur (1773-1849), French mathematicus
 Lucien Francoeur (born 1948), singer and poet of Quebec
 Raymond Francoeur (born 1946), Canadian politician
 Richard Francœur (1894–1971), French actor